Mandoulides Schools, or Mantoulidis Schools, is a private, coeducational institution in the Thessaloniki metropolitan area of Central Macedonia, Greece. Administratively within the boundaries of Thermi, south of Thessaloniki, the schools' two campuses are located outside urban structures near the A25 motorway. Mandoulides Schools offer schooling for students from Day Care through twelfth grade.

History 

Evangelos Mandoulides, professor of Ancient and Modern Greek, founded Mandoulides Schools in 1978. The school started as a traditional K6 school. In 1991 Evangelos Mantoulides decided to expand the school by adding a new campus and providing education for grades 7 through 12. In 2002 the Kindergarten, Primary, Junior and Senior High School opened their new premises. In 2009 the Day Care Centre admitted its first students.

Mandoulides Schools now include a Day Care Center, a Kindergarten, a Primary, a Junior and a Senior High School (Gymnasium and Lyceum). The schools are situated on two separate campuses just outside Thessaloniki, the second largest city in Greece.

Academics 

The school follows the standard curriculum prescribed by the Greek Ministry of Education, with additional hours in Mathematics, Physics, Chemistry, Biology, Informatics, Economics, Modern Greek, Ancient Greek, Latin, English, French and German.

English as a foreign language is obligatory and is taught at all grades. A bilingual language curriculum is offered for English native speakers and for highly proficient second language speakers.

Either German or French is obligatory and taught at all grades as a second foreign language.

Student activities 
a.	 Student Conferences

	100 + 1 years Alexandros Papadiamantis,
       150 years K.P.Kavafis
	100 years Thessaloniki the City of Great Educators

b.	Extra-curricular activities

 	Science Days
Workshops training students in Sciences, Math & Informatics
 	Math Camp
It offers the opportunity to develop the students’ talents in Mathematics.
	Debate Camp
Workshops training students for public speaking competitions in Greek and English.
	Readathlon
The ‘Literature in Education’ program encourages students to read novels for pleasure. Distinguished authors meet students and discuss their work.
 	 Community Service
Mandoulides Schools have inaugurated a volunteer program, within the framework of which students can offer their help and support to those in need.
	Counseling Services

c.	Clubs

Greek Debate, English Rhetoric & Debate-Forensics, Foreign Languages: French, German,  Mathematics, Computer Programming, Chess, Environmental Awareness, The Actor’s Studio, Drama, Choir, Orchestra, Traditional Dances, Modern Dances, Drawing,  Basketball, Soccer, Tennis, Volleyball, Table Tennis

Summer programs 

a.	English Language Summer Programs

Westminster College, Oxford - Tonbridge & Sevenoaks, Kent - Royal Holloway University, London -  Loughborough University, Leicestershire - Exeter University, Exeter -   University of Reading, Berkshire - Stratford-Upon-Avon College, Stratford-Upon- Avon-  Imperial College, London - Cambridge College of Arts & Sciences, Cambridge

b.	English & Adventure Camp

c.	Basketball Camp

d.	Soccer Camp

e.	Volleyball Camp

f. The Artist's Camp

Sports 

Sports teams

Basketball
Soccer
Volleyball
Tennis
Table Tennis
Skiing
Tae Kwon Do
Track and Field

Facilities

	Cultural and sports center
	Theater
	Indoor and outdoor basketball courts
Soccer fields
Tennis courts
Volleyball courts
	Playground activity park
Library
	Center for career and counseling services
	Physics, Biology and Chemistry labs
Computer labs
	Arts room
	Dance studios
	Music rooms
Infirmary
Cafeterias

References

External links
  

Private schools in Greece
Educational institutions established in 1978
1978 establishments in Greece
Education in Thessaloniki